Following is the province-wise list of waterfalls in Pakistan.

Azad Kashmir
 Kashmir Waterfalls - Neelum Valley
 Jamgar Waterfalls - Neelum Valley
 Kohala Waterfall - Bagh District
 Dhani Waterfall - Muzaffarabad District
 Patika Waterfall - Muzaffarabad District
 Twin Waterfalls of Gulpur - Kotli
 Cham Waterfall - Hattian Bala District
 Amra Sawan Waterfall - Hattian Bala District
 Tillni Waterfall - Sudhnuti District
 Kotla Waterfalls - Bagh District

Balochistan
 Pir Ghaib Waterfall - near Quetta
 Hanna-Urak Waterfall - near Hanna Lake, Urak Valley
 Chotok Waterfalls - near Khuzdar

Gilgit-Baltistan

 Manthokha Waterfall - Kharmang Valley, Skardu
 Khamosh Waterfall - Kharmang Valley 
 Farphu Waterfalls - Bagrot Valley

Khyber Pakhtunkhwa
 Chajian Waterfall - near Haripur
 ichaarr WaterFalls Mansehra
 Naran Kaghan Waterfalls - Kaghan Valley
 Baffa Waterfalls - near Mansehra
 Gojar Khan Waterfalls - Swat Valley
 Swabi Waterfalls - near Mardan
 Sajikot Waterfall - near Abbotabad
 Shingrai Waterfall - Manglawar, Swat Valley
 Jarogo Waterfall - near  Matta Tehsil, Swat
 Sabri Waterfall - near  Moolia, Abbotabad
 Umbrella Waterfall - near  Sajikot, Abbotabad
Noori Waterfall - Haripur

Punjab
 Ashraf Chhambar - Rawalpindi
 Marot Waterfalls - near Bahawalnagar
 Narh Waterfall - Rawalpindi
 Neela Sandh Waterfall - Mouri syedan
 Bala Kas Waterfall- Mouri syedan
 Kanathi Bagh Khushab - Soon Sakesar
 Neela Wahn نیلہ واہن - Kallar Kahar

Sindh
 Khadeji Waterfalls - near Karachi
 Hingan Waterfalls - near Gorakh Hill

See also
List of waterfalls
Tourism in Pakistan
Lakes of Pakistan
Valleys of Pakistan
Hill Stations of Pakistan

External links
 Waterfalls of Pakistan at 
 5 Waterfalls of Gilgit Baltistan
 15 Waterfalls of Pakistan
 13 Waterfalls of Pakistan
 15 Glorious Waterfalls of Pakistan
 Top Five Astonishing Waterfalls of Pakistan
 Neela Wahn (نیلہ واہن)

Lists of landforms of Pakistan

Lists of tourist attractions in Pakistan
Pakistan